The Bentley Arnage is a full-size high performance luxury car manufactured by Bentley Motors in Crewe, England, from 1998 to 2009. The Arnage and its Rolls-Royce-branded sibling, the Silver Seraph, were introduced in the spring of 1998. They were the first entirely new designs for the two marques since 1980.

The Arnage was powered by a BMW M62 V8 engine, with Cosworth-engineered twin-turbo installation, and the Seraph employed a BMW M73 V12 engine. In September 2008, Bentley announced that production of the model would end during 2009.

Development
Following an uplift in sales for all of Rolls-Royce, and a resurgence of the Bentley marque, the then-owner, Vickers, set about developing a new model to replace the derivatives of the Rolls-Royce Silver Spirit/Bentley Mulsanne which it had been selling since 1980. In a complete switch from tradition, these new cars would have engines provided by a third-party vendor, and bodies built at the Crewe factory.

A number of potential engines were examined, including the GM Premium V engine and the Mercedes-Benz M119 engine, before, in late 1994, Vickers selected a pair of BMW power plants.

This Arnage was renamed the Arnage Green Label for the 2000 model year. In addition, from 2000 to 2001, a special edition "Birkin" was produced, celebrating Tim Birkin of the "Bentley Boys."

Red Label and Green Label

During the takeover battle in 1998 between BMW and Volkswagen Group for ownership of Rolls-Royce and Bentley Motors, BMW had threatened to stop supply of their engines if Volkswagen Group won. While the threat was later withdrawn in conjunction with BMW acquiring the right to manufacture Rolls-Royce automobiles at a new location, it was clear that Volkswagen could not accept the business and reputation risks associated with having their rival as a long-term business partner. Furthermore, customers were uncertain about engine and part availability (of which there turned out to be no issue) and orders for new cars dropped precipitously. Volkswagen's response was to adapt the old 16-valve, 6.75-litre pushrod engine from the (Mulsanne) Turbo R for the Arnage body, which had been designed for the smaller and much lighter BMW 32-valve V8. Coupled with an outdated 4-speed automatic gearbox from General Motors, the engine was extremely thirsty, and would not meet government-imposed emissions standards without hasty modifications.

The revised version of the car was launched as the Arnage Red Label in October 1999. At the same time, but without fanfare, Bentley made several minor modifications to the original BMW engined cars, and designated them as the "Arnage Green Label" for the 2000 model year. The most important modifications, to both Red and Green Label cars, gave them stiffer body-shells, and larger wheels and brakes. Both the stiffer body-shells and the larger brakes were necessitated by the extra heft of the large old British engine. Despite the larger brakes, braking performance worsened with the extra weight of the 6.75 engine. Revisions included:

 Standard Alpine pop up navigation system.
 Park distance control to the front and rear.
 Increased rear seat leg room (by modifying the design of the front seatbacks).
 Power folding exterior mirrors.
 Modifications to the steering rack to reduce steering effort at low speeds.

The glass headlight lens covers (1998–99) were revised to plastic (2000 on).

Bentley cited customer demand as driving the reversion to the old two valve per cylinder 6.75-litre unit for the Red Label.

In reality, the outgoing BMW-powered Arnage was technically more modern, considerably more fuel efficient, and had 32 valves with double overhead camshafts, twin-turbochargers and Bosch engine management technology – as opposed to the 16-valve, single turbocharger and a pushrod engine with less advanced engine management. The Red Label's increase in motive power shaved less than a second of the 0 to  acceleration time. However, the BMW twin-turbocharged unit remained noticeably more agile and responsive from a driver's perspective, due to its more responsive character, better weight balance (maintaining a 51.1/48.9 weight distribution) and almost  lower curb weight. Ultimately the Green Label was more reliable and significantly less expensive to service in the long term.

Vickers had outsourced the production of the old 6.75-litre Rolls-Royce engine for use in the contemporary Continental R and Azure models to Cosworth, so reverting to the old standby engine was a natural choice for the company.

This was the greatest amount of torque for a four-door car at the time. Also returning was the General Motors-sourced four-speed 4L80-E automatic transmission.

In total only seven Arnage Green Label units were built, all of which were left-hand-drive versions. There was a final series of cars built in 2000 with the 4.4-litre BMW engine designated the Arnage Birkin, of which 52 units were produced and are distinguishable by their three-dial as opposed to five-dial instrument center dashboard configuration.

A long-wheelbase version of the Red Label was launched at the North American International Auto Show in 2001. The Red Label models were replaced in 2002 by the Arnage R.

Model year updates
In 2001, the Arnage LWB (re-named the RL from MY2003), a long-wheelbase model ( longer than the Arnage), was launched. The extra length is added to the car at both its front and rear doors and its C-pillar to maintain its proportions. With the standard Arnage model, the rear wheel wells butt up against the rear door frames, but with the LWB & RL they are a few inches further back. The overall effect is a larger rear area inside the car. This style of saloon stretch is sometimes called "double-cut" in the United States, due to the two main points where the car is extended. (Jankel and Andy Hotton Associates, for example, are two aftermarket coachbuilders especially known for this style.) Available only as a bespoke ("Mulliner") model, each LWB & RL is customised to the desires of the buyer. The LWB, however, was also the first of a new series of Arnages which would finally cure the Bentley Arnage of the reliability and performance deficiencies experienced following its forced deprivation of the modern BMW engines it was designed to use. The RL would also present a credible challenge to BMW's attempts to revive the Rolls-Royce brand with its planned new model, the Phantom.

The  wheelbase version is stretched between the front and rear doors (rather than at the C-pillar and at the rear doors). The suspension was retuned for the added weight, allowing the larger car to still handle well.

RL models were available with armoured elements, reflecting the car's clientele. A full B6 package was available for $243,000 to $300,000, offering protection from assault weapons and grenades.

Though not particularly well advertised for reasons stated above, the LWB&RL's introduction saw the introduction of an entirely reworked version of the 6.75-litre V8 engine. Where the engine used in the Red Label was a quickly and less-than-completely-satisfactorily modified version of the Turbo R's unit, the RL featured an entirely reworked version of the old 6.75-litre V8. More than half of the engine's parts were completely new, with Bosch Motronic ME7.1.1 engine management replacing the old Zytek system, and two small Garrett T3 turbochargers replacing the single large T4. The Arnage was now powered by a modern twin-turbocharged unit with state-of-the-art electronic management system similar to the original Cosworth-BMW unit developed for the model in 1998.

In 2002, Bentley updated the Red Label as the series two Arnage R. This model was launched to contrast the Arnage T, which was developed to be a more sporty variant. The Arnage R features two Garrett T3 turbochargers fitted to the engine as with the RL.

The Arnage T, also from 2002, was claimed to be the most powerful roadgoing Bentley at its launch at the Detroit Motor Show.

All Arnage R and T models share the same  wheelbase. The Arnage range was facelifted in 2005, with a front end resembling that of the new Continental GT and old Continental R.

UK State Limousine
The Bentley State Limousine is an official state car developed by Bentley Motors Limited for Queen Elizabeth II on the occasion of her Golden Jubilee in 2002. Two were built.

2007 mechanical update

For the 2007 model year, the Garrett turbochargers were replaced with low-inertia Mitsubishi units designed to improve engine response. The engine was mated to a 6-speed ZF 6HP26 transmission also found in the Continental GT range.

Specifications
Arnage T
Max. power:  at 4,200 rpm
Peak torque:   at 3,200 rpm
0–97 km/h (0-60 mph): 5.2 seconds
0–100 km/h (0-62 mph): 5.5 s
max. speed: 

Arnage R and Arnage RL
Max, power:  at 4,100 rpm
Peak torque:   at 1,800 rpm
0–97 km/h (0-60 mph): 5.5 seconds
0–100 km/h (0-62 mph): 5.8  seconds
max. speed:

Le Mans series
Bentley launched two limited Le Mans edition models to celebrate the occasion of Bentley's return after 71 years to racing at Le Mans. Production was planned of 50 Le Mans editions of the Continental R Mulliner and 150 of the Bentley Arnage Red label. Actually 46 copies were manufactured of the Continental R Le Mans and 153 of the Arnage Le Mans. Besides those planned models also 5 Le Mans editions were manufactured of the Continental T Le Mans and 4 of the Bentley Azure Le Mans.

The Le Mans editions didn't replace any other model but were special editions of existing models. The Arnage Le Mans was a specially enhanced edition of the Arnage Red label.

Exterior Le Mans Series Options
 Exclusive quad exhaust pipes.
 Ducting vents in the front wing.
 Wide wheel arches and sports bumpers.
 Red brake calipers.
 "Le Mans Series" badges on the front quarter panel.
 5-spoke sport wheels with red brake calipers.
Interior Le Mans Series Options
 Unique instruments with a dark Racing Green background colour.
 "Le Mans Series" lettering on the speedometer and rev counter.
 Dark finished burr walnut on the Arnage Red Label with the Bentley wings etched in intricate detail and inlaid into the waist rails of the doors as well as into the dashboard.
 Winged B motifs embroidered into the headrests of the two-tone, perforated hide upholstery.
 Exclusive chrome and leather design of the gear lever.
 Drilled pedals.
 Unique door sill plaques.
 Three unique colours: Silver Storm, Black Oriole, and Le Mans Racing Green, although any Arnage colour may have been selected.
Identification of the chassis number

The Bentley Arnage Le Mans chassis number follows the same identification as the Bentley Arnage Red label model:
 the letter L on the fourth position,
 the letter C on the fifth position, and
 a number between 6341 and 8375.

Diamond series
Bentley marked its 60 years of production at the Crewe factory with a special Diamond Series Arnage model in 2006. 60 cars were planned, the majority for the United States, with diamond wood inlays, diamond quilted leather seats, a stainless steel front bumper, special 19 inch alloy wheels, and Union Jack badges on the front wings.

Final series

In September 2008, Bentley announced that Arnage production would cease in 2009, with a final run of 150 "Final Series" models.

The Arnage delivers power to the rear-wheels via the same ZF automatic transmission as used on the other Arnage models.

On the exterior, the Final Series features unique 20 inch alloy wheels, a retractable 'Flying B' hood ornament, body-coloured headlamp bezels, dark tint mesh upper and lower grilles, lower front wing vents, a 'Jewel-style' fuel filler cap and special badging.

The interior, designed by Mulliner, features Final Series kick plates, drilled alloy pedals, unique chrome trim, a rear cocktail cabinet and two picnic tables.  The model also comes with four special umbrellas and a premium 1,000 watt audio system manufactured by Naim Audio.

The model is offered with 42 exterior colour choices, 25 interior hides and three wood veneers. It could also be selected with the bespoke colour-matching offered by Bentley.

The Final Series also marked the 50th anniversary of Bentley's V8 engine. The 2009 variant of the engine was still loosely based on the same design that was introduced in the 1959 Bentley S2. However, the updated engine in 2008 shares no interchangeable parts with the 1950 model, the last common item having been replaced in 2005. When the engine was first unveiled promotional literature described power and torque as 'adequate'. Now twin-turbocharged, the all-aluminium alloy engine delivered a 0–97 km/h (60 mph) in 5.3 seconds in a car weighing 2.5 tonnes. Fuel consumption was heavy, with Bentley stating that the model averages less than 10 mpg in the city and just over 20 on the highway in European testing.

A replacement model, which was called the Bentley Mulsanne was launched in August 2009, at the Pebble Beach Concours d'Elegance, in Monterey, California.

Reception
The Arnage was well received by the motoring press, with most critics admiring the unimpeachable image but criticising the price and running cost.

The AA 'The Arnage is hard to judge in the terms of ordinary cars due to its expense, but despite the price tag it offers a huge amount for the money. It has the image, the grace, performance, luxury and comfort in equal measure, yet it is a class apart from more modern rivals.'
Auto Express 'For: Huge performance, classic British luxury, modern safety aids''Against: Whopping price tag, hefty weight, [new Continental] Flying Spur'
Evo 'Positives – Improved dynamics, power delivery''Negatives – Fussy interior, almost too much power'
Parker's Car Guides 'Pros: Impressive agility for such a big car, sheer road presence, classy image''Cons: Size and running costs'
RAC (7.6/10)'The Bentley Arnage is the finest product ever to come out of the Crewe. Bang up to date where it needs to be and reassuringly anachronistic in other areas, it's mightily impressive'
Top Gear 'Imperious, untouchable, gilt-edged yet raw-powered motoring. When the cloud of dust settles this had better be the car you step from, or you're no gentleman'
What Car? 'For – The Arnage has lightning-quick acceleration, a luxury interior, and bags of standard kit''Against – It suffers from poor fuel consumption, it lacks practicality, and depreciation will be a huge cost'
Yahoo! Cars 'For potential owners of this car, it's not how fast you get there but how you get there that counts'

Successor

The Bentley Arnage was replaced by the Bentley Mulsanne. The design of the car is now completely independent from Rolls-Royce cars, because of separate parent companies, Bentley being held by the Volkswagen Group, Rolls-Royce by BMW.

References

External links

BentleyMotors.com official international portal
Bentley Motors UK

Arnage
Flagship vehicles
Full-size vehicles
Rear-wheel-drive vehicles
Sedans
2000s cars
Cars introduced in 1998
Limousines